Haut-Uélé (French for "Upper Uélé") is one of the 21 new provinces of the Democratic Republic of the Congo created in the 2015 repartitioning. Haut-Uélé, Bas-Uélé, Ituri, and Tshopo provinces are the result of the dismemberment of the former Orientale province.  Haut-Uélé was formed from the Haut-Uélé district whose town of Isiro was elevated to capital city of the new province.

Administration
The principal communities are Niangara, Dungu, Faradje, Watsa, Rungu, Isiro and Wamba.
The capital of the province is the town of Isiro.

Territories are
 Dungu
 Faradje
 Niangara
 Rungu
 Wamba
 Watsa

Villages are
Bagbele

References

 
Provinces of the Democratic Republic of the Congo